Volleyball at the 1996 Summer Olympics featured men's and women's Beach volleyball for the first time as an official Olympic sport. Men's and Women's indoor volleyball tournaments also took place.

Medal table

Medal summary

References

External links
Volleyball

 
1996 Summer Olympics events
O
O
1996
International volleyball competitions hosted by the United States
Volleyball in Georgia (U.S. state)